Mustafa Shokay (romanized: Mūstafa Şoqaiūly, Russian: Мустафа́ Шока́й); 25 December 1890 – 27 December 1941) was a Kazakh social and political activist and ideologue of the Turkestan Autonomy. From 1921, he lived in exile in France.

Early life 
Mustafa Shokay was born into a Muslim Kazakh family of aristocrats in the Kazakh town of Ak-Meshit (modern Kyzylorda, Kazakhstan). During this period the status of family was evaluated by the number of cattle they possessed, meaning that Mustafa's family was wealthy  in their village due to the high number of cattle in their possession. Mustafa's paternal grandfather was the Datkha, which in Persian means – "a wish, request, Justice".  The Datkha was equal to a Sultan and was higher in title than the Bey. Mustafa's grandfather was electing Prime Minister – Datkha of Khiva's khan. The Datkha was subordinate only to the Khan and was often tasked with helping him manage the Khanate. The mother of Mustafa was Bakty, an intellectual in her own right and a descendant of the famous Batu Khan. Bakty was well-educated, in Kazakh, Arabic, and Persian. Mustafa and his family were from the Middle Juz (horde) of the Kypchak’s tribe, Torgai clan, Shashty popliteal, Boshay knee, Janay popliteal. 
Before the October Revolution in 1917 Shokay's Family and about 30 of his relatives lived in one village, which was located in 5 kilometers from the station of Sulu-Tube. They lived in nice yurts, (nomad's houses). Mustafa's father had 2 wives, with Bakty being his second one. Bakty gave birth two 2 sisters and 3 brothers in addition to him. Most of the other children in the Shokay family are undocumented, but sources do mention that Mustafa had an older brother named Nurtaza.  Mustafa was the youngest child in their family and was 15 years younger than his Sadyk brothers. 

Mustafa's mother taught her children to read and write in childhood, helping them learn Kazakh, Arabic, and Persian just as she did. When he was 5 years old, Mustafa learned to play on the dombra. From childhood he was musically gifted, and had a great ear and for music. In their village was a local mullah, who was taught to read the Quran and assisted Mustafa in understanding the Islamic Holy Book. Mustafa set himself apart from other students by perfectly memorizing all of the sura from the Quran by heart. 

At the age of 7, Mustafa's father took him to the urbanized part of Ak-Meshit, where he would study in a Russian school and slowly assimilate into Russian society.  While his father was in favor of him receiving a higher education and at least partially assimilating, Mustafa's mother feared that he would forget his Muslim Kazakh roots and forever be Russianized. Moreover, the mullah of Ak-Meshit added to all of this by claiming that the Russians will put him on the cross should Mustafa refuse to give up Islam. Mustafa was initially hesitant to go to the Russian school, but his father was able to effectively persuade him into furthering his education there.

Mustafa started his education in the Russian school, but he became very sick and soon left his studies. In 1902 he was admitted to a Tashkent gymnasium and in 1910 he graduated with the school's gold medal. General Samsonov (Alexander Samsonov (1859–1914), a Russian military commander during World War I) was against Mustafa receiving the gold medal and insisted that an ethnic Russian student should win. The gold was then handed to Zeprometov, a Russian student in the program. However, the director of the Tashkent gymnasium disagreed and even Zeprometov himself said that Shokay should get the gold medal.  After a brief conflict, the medal was given back to Mustafa. 

The intentions of Samsonov caused outrage not only within the ranks of the local youth, but also from the Russians. All of the professors and Russian intellectuals were ready to strike. That strike was provoked by the administration, showing the unfair treatment to the student in favor of the officials.
Trying to smooth over the scandal, Samsonov approached Mustafa with a proposal to be an interpreter in his administration, but he refused Samsonov's request and went to St. Petersburg to enter the university's law faculty (1910–1917). 

In 1912 Mustafa's father died and the local villagers asked him to return home at the request of family to replace the post of his father – a judge.  This event caused Mustafa to once again put a hold on his education. He returned to complete the final stage of his education one year later in St. Petersburg.  Towards the end of his education, the Stolypin agrarian reform in Kazakhstan occurred, and many Kazakhs became resettled peasants by the Russian imperial administration. Mustafa moved back to Ak-Meshit, where his family remained as one of the few who did not suffer any dramatic effects of the Stolypin agrarian reform.

Activities in St. Petersburg 
During study in St. Petersburg, Mustafa was trying to protect not only the interest of his countryman, but the whole Kazakh nation. However, on 3 July 1907, Tsar Nikolai II issued a decree depriving the electoral rights of the indigenous peoples of Siberia and Central Asia. They lost their way with little representation in the State Duma of Russia. But the Kazakh politicians and intellectuals continued to fight for the interests of the people. Working in the Duma, Shokai met with prominent Muslim political leaders of Russia and became friends with Ahmad Zaki Validi, the future chairman of the Bashkir autonomy.

In the midst of heavy the First World War 25 June 1916, Tsar Nicholas II issued a decree "On the requisition of foreigners", attracting the indigenous population of Turkestan and the Steppe region in age from 19 to 43 years to rear work – digging trenches, despite the fact that the Muslims were exempted from military service due to the deprivation of electoral rights. The decree came in the days of Ramadan and the height of the agricultural work that has outraged the entire nation. Then was launched a powerful uprising in Turkestan and the Steppe region. In the Kazakh steppes rebellion led Amangeldy Imanov.
In the State Duma there were protests. Mustafa Shokai entered his commission as a secretary and translator of the Muslim faction. Subsequent performances of Kerensky in the Duma with the analysis of the Turkestan uprising against the imperial government policies brought him huge popularity throughout Russia. When he returned to Petrograd, Shokai prepared materials for their performances in the State Duma of their faction. However the State Duma was dissolved by Tsar Nicholas II, and then he himself abdicated.

Character of Mustafa Shokay 
Like other ethnic Kazakhs, Mustafa Shokay remained a devout Muslim all throughout his life.  During his student life, in fact during his all life, Mustafa was not involved in any political party. He was a democrat, without the slightest hint of socialism, who loved his homeland and his nation. Mustafa never spared himself in the name of the future of his people. There were politicians for peace or for the war and Mustafa belonged to the politicians for peace. Mustafa's character was soft and easily vulnerable. He knew that to work in the State Duma he had to be a strong person. 
Shokay admired and highly valued Mustafa Kemal, a Turkish nationalist who used his stances to found the modern-day Republic of Turkey. Shokay considered that Turkestan needed a political reformer like himself. Mustafa Shokay did not have any hostile emotions toward bigots or to representatives of other nations. He loved to make discussions or argue with people who possessed different political opinions than him. In arguments he was calm and ever respected his opponent's standpoint. He always took any inhumane acts to his heart. He was able to find the way to heart of people throughout honesty and the ability to empathize with others. Sometimes he stood really heatedly, defending his position, but in all cases did not hurt the feeling of his opponent. Mustafa was the enemy of narrow-minded nationalism. He defended his interest for position of Turkestan's people union. However, the Russian nationalist recognized Mustafa's position, but they did not want to regard with interest of Turkestan's nation, also with non-Russian nations. These principles of Russian democracy really hurt the feeling of Mustafa Shokay and for this reason he severed good relations with the Russian periodical press in 1923 (mass-media).

Political career 
In 1914 World War I began and Mustafa as a student became a member of State Duma as a secretary. Mustafa was introducing to the Muslim fraction on the recommendation of Alikhan Bukeikhanov. Until 1917, before the October revolution Mustafa was a member of State Duma and he joined the political life of Turko-Tatar peoples. The formal political activities began in 1917 when Mustafa Shokay was delegated to the congress of Muslims in Moscow. This big congress of Turkestan's was held by his initiatives. Mustafa was a member of Turkestan committee of Interim Government and after he was elected as a chairman of Turkestan's national committee.
 
On 10 December 1917 the project of creating autonomy was submitted. On the 4th Congress in Turkestan, Turkestan autonomy, known as the Kokand Autonomy. After overthrowing the Russian Provisional Government was declared in Petrograd during the armed uprising on 25 October, the Bolsheviks carried out popular measures for the people in the election-Russian Constituent Assembly of Russia. But in election 12 November 1917 the Bolsheviks received only 23.9% of the vote against 40.4% for the Right Socialist-Revolutionaries. 

In such circumstances, the Kokand government announced its intention to create on 20 March 1918, its parliament by universal direct, equal and secret ballot. Two thirds of the seats in parliament were for Muslim MPs and one third – representatives of non-Muslims. The existence of such a parliament was to be the first step towards the democratization of Turkestan. Chairman of People's Commissars of the Turkestan Republic Fedor Kolesov, said: "We can not allow Muslims to the supreme authorities, since the position of the local population against us is not defined and, in addition, they have no proletarian organization"

But on 11 February 1918 Bolsheviks sent troops to Kokand. The power was on equal and Kokand was completely destroyed, the troops were armed with machine guns and cannons, which were not in Kokand, Turkestan. Shokay moved through Fergana to Tashkent. On his head a bounty of 1000 rubbles was placed. At that time Mustafa Shokay was the youngest politician, who advocated for Turkestan Autonomy, but he was against separatism. When he was in hiding Mustafa met his old friend Maria Gorina, whom he married in April 1918, After this event Shokay said:” We called the soviet power then established in Tashkent the «enemy of our people». I have not changed my view on the matter in the last ten years.”  
During the following years Shokay wrote and published a book:” Turkestan under the Soviet Union (On the characteristics of the dictatorship of the proletariat)”.

Emigration 
Traveling through the Kazakh steppe and the Caspian Sea, Mustafa Shokay manage to safely arrived in Baku, Azerbaijan, then Tbilisi, Georgia where he lived with his wife of two years, from spring 1919 till February 1921. Shokay moved to Turkey, because The Red Army led by Ordzhonikidze, defeated the Volunteer Army of General Denikin, captured the North Caucasus, then Azerbaijan, Armenia, and 16 February 1921 came to Tiflis. The democratic Republic of Transcaucasia was overthrown by the Soviet Union. After the events in Transcaucasia Mustafa Shokay and his wife Maria Shokay emigrated to Istanbul, Turkey. Shokay in Istanbul wrote articles in English for “The Times” and for publications like “Şafak”, also for “Yeni Dünya”- “New World”. Then he found that Alexander Kerensky, who also emigrated to Paris from Russia. Kerensky helped Shokay to get a French visa and in the summer of 1921 Mustafa with Maria moved to Paris. He was writing articles for the newspaper of Kerensky “Days” and Milyukova's “Last News”. In 1923 Mustafa and Maria Shokay moved to Nozhan-Sur-Marn, spoke for the European public with the speech "The policy of Russia and Turkestan National Movement". The time during the exile it was the most darkness period for both of Mr. and Mss. Shokay. Mustafa Shokay was trying to write books, newspapers, magazines; held meeting with his speech for whole world to submit and to hear about the problems in Turkestan and Central Asia. These editions was published in Istanbul, Paris, Berlin, London, Warsaw, he published articles about Central Asia, theoretical studies, historical and political review. Mustafa Shokay created newspaper in Istanbul:”New Turkestan” in 1927 and it was existed till 1931. In 1929 he settled in Berlin edition of the magazine "Yash (Young) Turkestan" and became its editor in chief. The magazine last until the outbreak of World War II in 1939, was released 117 editions. Mustafa Shokay spoke foreign languages such as English, French, Russian, German, Turkish, and Arabic.

Unsuccessful Collaboration with the Nazi Germany
On the day of Operation Barbarossa, the attack of the Axis powers on the Soviet Union on 22 June 1941, the German occupations troops in Paris arrested all the well-known emigrants from the territories of the Soviet Union and imprisoned them in the castle of Compiègne (Château de Compiègne). Those imprisoned included Shokay.

After three weeks, Shokay was taken to Berlin and after two weeks offered to lead the Turkestan Legion. This unit was meant to include Soviet military prisoners of Turkic descent held in German prisoner of war camps. The Nazis hoped for Mustafa Shokay's authority. But the Legion had been partially replenished by elite German troops which had combat experience against Soviet troops on the Eastern Front, while Shokay was required to familiarize Turkic prisoners with circumstances of their fellow countrymen in the camps. He was shocked by the inhuman conditions of Asians kept behind barbed wire.

Detailing the journey of Mustafa's life, he entertained the possibility of creating a union of Muslim states with the help of Germany. To achieve this goal, it would be necessary to organize Muslim-Soviet prisoners of war – particularly from the army. And acquired goals should be overthrowing Soviet governments in Kazakhstan and Central Asia. Mustafa Shokai said that he was ready to consent to be the head of this noble movement. The collaboration made known to the ideological leader of the National Socialist party on matters of ideology and foreign policy, the Minister for the "Eastern Territories" General SS Alfred Rosenberg.

Mustafa Shokay wanted to give some relief and grasped the chance to save prisoners' lives, he compromised with the German authorities. He set his conditions:
Create staff for the future of Turkestan state schools in Germany;
Create military forces from follow prisoners, which will be used only when approaching the borders of Turkestan.

Mustafa Shokay wanted to receive some benefit from the collaboration with Nazis. Unfortunately Adolf Hitler declined in all queries, because Hitler considered the Turkestan Legion as “cannon fodder”. Later Shokay wrote a letter to the Ministry of Foreign Affairs Gruppenführer Joachim von Ribbentrop: “Seeing how representatives of the nation, who raised such geniuses as Goethe, Feuerbach, Bach, Beethoven, Schopenhauer, treat prisoners of war ... I can not accept the offer to lead the ... Turkestan Legion and refuse further cooperation. All the consequences of my decision, I realize.” 
Adolf Hitler realized his attempted manipulation of Mustafa Shokay was going to fail; the German leadership decided to remove him. On 22 December 1941, Hitler signed a decree for the establishment of the Turkestan and other national legions. At that time Mustafa was in hospital in Berlin "Victoria". On 27 December 1941, he died. The official report stated that he "died of blood poisoning on the background of an emerging epidemic of typhus," he was infected when visiting concentration camps. But the same symptoms could be poisoning. Moreover, in the memoirs of his wife Maria Gorina-Shokay, she wrote that Mustafa had been ill with typhus in Turkestan and he was supposed to be immune. Mustafa Shokai was buried in the Turkish Muslim cemetery (Osmanidov) in Berlin. On the tombstone just below the date at the behest of his wife M. Shokay, Maria Jakovlevna, there are three letters in Latin and four numbers: JOH.15.13. They point to the thirteenth verse of the fifteenth chapter of the Gospel of John: "There is no greater love than this; that a man lay down his life for his friends."

The Turkestan Legion army was later granted to Nazi-loyalist Veli Kayum, a long standing cooperative of the anti-Soviet movement Prometheism. He was honorifically titled Khan after he had no problem embracing Nazi vision to build Turkic-Muslim army which would fight Soviets.

Selected works 
 Mustafa Shokay. «Chez les Soviets en Asie Centrale», Paris, 1928.
 Mustafa Shokay. «The Basmati Movement in Turkestan», «The Asiatic Review», vol. XXIV, 1928.
 Mustafa Shokay -oghly: «Туркестан под властью советов», Paris, 1935.
 Mustafa Shokay. «Избранное» (в 2-х томах), Алматы, Кайнар, 1998.
 Mustafa Shokay. “Revolution in Turkestan, February's era” 2001.
 Mustafa Shokay. ”New Turkestan”, Istanbul, 1927.
 Mustafa Shokay "Yash (Young) Turkestan", Berlin, 1929 was released 117 editions.
Mustafa Shokay was fluent in English, French, Russian, German, Turkish, and Arabic.

Memory 
 2000 – In Kazakhstan, a documentary book published Amirhana Bakirova "Operation" France "," Kyzyl-Orda, 2000. 
 2001 – Kazakhstan has translated and published the memoirs of Maria Shokay: "I am writing to you from Nozhan" (Memoirs, Letters, Documents, 1958), Almaty, "Kynar" 
 2001 – In the Nogent-sur-Marne, in the park at the La Fontaine house number 7, where he lived 18 years, Mustafa Shokai, a monument-stele 
 2003 – At the "Kazakhfilm" came dock. Film "Zar, or excommunication from the Motherland" (dir. – Makhmetova C. and O. Rymzhanov, the scenario B. Sadykova).
 2006 – His name streets in Kzylorda and Almaty. 
 2007 – Magazine "Continent" (Almaty) has published an article B. Sadykova "In Memory of Turkestan Jadid (Mustafa Chokai)"
 2008 – In the Paris suburb of Nogent-sur-Marne memorial plaque in memory of Shokai 
 2008 – Went film "Mustafa Shokai", dir. S. Narymbetov, "Kazakhfilm" in Sec. Starring Aziz Beyshenaliev and Karina Abdullina 
 2011 – Went document. film "Дорогами Мустафы Шокая" (directed by K. Begmanov)

References

1890 births
1941 deaths
People from Kyzylorda Region
Kazakhstani Muslims
Russian Constituent Assembly members
Pan-Turkists
Turkestan
Central Asian studies scholars
Kazakhstani anti-communists
Deaths from typhus
Collaborators with Nazi Germany